Nagavskaya is a rural locality (a khutor) and the administrative center of Nagavskoye Rural Settlement, Kotelnikovsky District, Volgograd Oblast, Russia. The population was 730 as of 2010. There are 11 streets.

Geography 
Nagavskaya is located on the left bank of the Tsimlyansk Reservoir, 35 km northwest of Kotelnikovo (the district's administrative centre) by road. Mayorovsky is the nearest rural locality.

References 

Rural localities in Kotelnikovsky District
Don Host Oblast